Douglas Ward Allen (born August 15, 1960) is a Canadian economist and the Burnaby Mountain Professor of Economics at Simon Fraser University. He is known for his research on transaction costs and property rights, and how these influence the structure of organizations and institutions. His research covers four broad areas: transaction cost theory, economic history, agricultural organizations, and the family.

Allen's most cited academic work is "What Are Transaction Costs?" Here Allen notes that economists traditionally had thought of transaction costs as mere frictions to market transactions.  The problem with this conception is that these types of costs are purely neoclassical, and fail to violate the Coase Theorem.  Allen brought together ideas in the property rights literature with those of transaction costs, to define transaction costs as those costs incurred from establishing and maintaining economic property rights. When these costs are zero, the Coase Theorem holds, when they are positive, the Coase Theorem fails.

In 2013 his work on the effects of same-sex parenting on children's educational outcomes received public attention. Using Canadian census data, he estimated that children of same-sex parents were less likely to graduate from high school compared to children from opposite-sex married families. His study also asserted that child educational success in same-sex households depended on the gender composition of the household, a finding similar to an earlier article by Allen, Pakaluk, and Price, which used the US census. However, these estimated differences disappeared when accounting for family stability.

In 2014, he testified as an expert witness in defense of Michigan's marriage laws. At the end of his four-hour testimony, plaintiff attorney Ken Mogill asked him: "Professor Allen, yes or no, are gays going to hell?"  Allen replied: "Unless they repent, yes." Many in the press took this to mean that he believed that people who engage in homosexual acts will go to hell. Allen has stated he was only referring to Luke 13:3 where Jesus stated all will perish (regardless of sexuality) unless they repent. The state of Michigan defended Allen's remarks, arguing that they did not taint the expert statistical conclusions he expressed in his testimony. The judge in that case, Bernard A. Friedman, subsequently overturned the ban and concluded that Allen's research, along with the research of Professors Loren Marks and Joe Price, on same-sex marriage represented a "fringe viewpoint" and rejected the use of snowball sampling as a legitimate statistical strategy.

Publications 
 The Nature of the Farm (MIT Press, 2002) 

 The Institutional Revolution: Measurement and the Economic Emergence of the Modern World (University of Chicago Press, 2012)

References

External links
Douglas W. Allen's faculty page

Canadian economists
1960 births
Living people
Academic staff of Simon Fraser University
University of Washington alumni